Pleasant Springs may refer to:
 Pleasant Springs, former name of Rich Gulch, California
 Pleasant Springs, former name of Murray, Kentucky
 Pleasant Springs, former name of Preston, Mississippi
 Pleasant Springs, Wisconsin